Jeżów Sudecki is a village in Jelenia Góra County, Lower Silesian Voivodeship, in south-western Poland. It is the seat of the administrative district (gmina) called Gmina Jeżów Sudecki. 

Jeżów Sudecki is one of the places considered as the "birthplace of the sport of gliding".

The village has a population of 1,800.

See also
Grunau Baby
Hanna Reitsch
Wolf Hirth
Karkonosze National Park

References

External links
The Gliding Factory

Villages in Karkonosze County